Raduzhny Airport  is an airport in Khanty-Mansi Autonomous Okrug, Russia located  northwest of Raduzhny. It accommodates wide body airliners. The airport was closed in 2005.

External links

References

  

Defunct airports
Airports built in the Soviet Union
Airports in Khanty-Mansi Autonomous Okrug